Manhattan Spotlight is an American television program broadcast on the now defunct DuMont Television Network.

Broadcast history
The series was a talk show ran from 1949 to 1951 hosted by Charles Tranum. The program, produced and distributed by DuMont, aired Monday through Friday at 7:30pm or 7:45pm ET on most DuMont affiliates.

From December 1949 to June 1950, Easy Aces aired in the Wednesday 7:45pm slot. During the 1950-1951 season, the Hazel Scott, Joan Edwards, and Susan Raye shows all ran in the 7:45pm ET slot immediately after Manhattan Spotlight.

The series was cancelled in 1951, and DuMont replaced the series with local (non-network) programming.

See also
List of programs broadcast by the DuMont Television Network
List of surviving DuMont Television Network broadcasts

References

Bibliography
David Weinstein, The Forgotten Network: DuMont and the Birth of American Television (Philadelphia: Temple University Press, 2004) 
Alex McNeil, Total Television, Fourth edition (New York: Penguin Books, 1980) 
Tim Brooks and Earle Marsh, The Complete Directory to Prime Time Network TV Shows, Third edition (New York: Ballantine Books, 1964)

External links

DuMont historical website

DuMont Television Network original programming
1949 American television series debuts
1951 American television series endings
1940s American television series
1950s American television series
Black-and-white American television shows